The 1995 All-Mid-American Conference football team consists of American football players chosen for the All-Mid-American Conference ("MAC") teams for the 1995 NCAA Division I-A football season. MAC champion Toledo was undefeated but placed only three players on the first team: running back Wasean Tait, tight end Steve Rosi, and defensive lineman Steve Haynes. Miami (OH) finished in second place with an 8–2–1 record and placed five players on the first team: running back Deland McCullough, offensive lineman Mike Bird, linebackers Dee Osborne and Kenyon Harper, and defensive back Johnnie Williams.

Offensive selections

Quarterbacks
 Charlie Batch, Eastern Michigan

Running backs
 Deland McCullough, Miami (OH)
 Wasean Tait, Toledo
 Astron Whatley, Kent State

Wide receivers
 Steve Clay, Eastern Michigan
 Tony Knox, Jr., Western Michigan

Tight ends
 Steve Rosi, Toledo

Offensive linemen
 Mike Bird, Miami (OH)
 Chad Bukey, Bowling Green
 Tony Roush, Ball State
 Barry Stokes, Eastern Michigan
 Brock Gutierrez, Central Michigan

Defensive selections

Defensive linemen
 Greg Cepek, Bowling Green
 Steve Haynes, Toledo
 Keith McKenzie, Ball State
 Dion Powell, Western Michigan

Linebackers
 Dee Osborne, Miami (OH) [OLB]
 Jason Woullard, Bowling Green [OLB]
 Kenyon Harper, Miami (OH) [ILB]
 Andre Vaughn, Western Michigan [ILB]

Defensive backs
 Cory Gillard, Ball State
 Tristan Moss, Western Michigan
 Johnnie Williams, Miami (OH)
 Quincy Wright, Central Michigan

Special teams

Placekickers
 Derek Schoreis, Bowling Green

Punters
 Brad Maynard, Ball State

References

All-Mid-American Conference football team
All-Mid-American Conference football teams